The 1947 Soviet Cup was an association football cup competition of the Soviet Union.

Competition schedule

Preliminary stage

Group 1 (Russian Federation)

First round
 [Jun 7] 
 KHIMIK Dzerzhinsk            3-2  Krylya Sovetov Ufa 
 TORPEDO Gorkiy               6-0  ZiK Kaliningrad (Moscow Region) 
 [Jun 8] 
 KRASNOYE ZNAMYA Ivanovo      4-1  Zenit Izhevsk 
 TORPEDO Ulyanovsk            3-2  Zenit Kovrov

Quarterfinals
 [Jun 15] 
 DINAMO Kazan                 w/o  Torpedo Yaroslavl 
 Dinamo Saratov               1-2  TRAKTOR Kuibyshev 
 TORPEDO Gorkiy               5-2  Krasnoye Znamya Ivanovo 
 TORPEDO Ulyanovsk            w/o  Khimik Dzerzhinsk

Semifinals
 [Jun 20] 
 Dinamo Kazan                 0-1  TORPEDO Ulyanovsk 
 [Jun 22] 
 TORPEDO Gorkiy               3-1  Traktor Kuibyshev

Final
 [Jun 27] 
 TORPEDO Gorkiy               5-0  Torpedo Ulyanovsk

Group 2 (Russian Federation)

First round
 [Jun 1] 
 DINAMO Sverdlovsk            6-1  Avangard Sverdlovsk 
 ODO Novosibirsk              4-0  Krylya Sovetov Molotov

Quarterfinals
 [Jun 8] 
 ODO Novosibirsk              5-0  Krylya Sovetov Novosibirsk 
 [Jun 9] 
 DINAMO Sverdlovsk            3-0  Dzerzhinets Chelyabinsk 
 Dzerzhinets Nizhniy Tagil    0-1  DINAMO Chelyabinsk 
 ODO Sverdlovsk               9-0  Krylya Sovetov Omsk

Semifinals
 [Jun 15] 
 DINAMO Chelyabinsk           2-1  ODO Novosibirsk 
 DINAMO Sverdlovsk            1-0  ODO Sverdlovsk

Final
 [Jun 22] 
 DINAMO Chelyabinsk           2-1  Dinamo Sverdlovsk

Group Caucasus

Quarterfinals
 [Jun 1] 
 DINAMO Rostov-na-Donu        3-0  Krylya Sovetov Tbilisi 
 Lokomotiv Tbilisi            1-1  ODO Tbilisi 
 Neftyanik Baku               2-3  DINAMO Yerevan 
 SPARTAK Yerevan              2-0  Dinamo Baku

Quarterfinals replays
 [Jun 2] 
 LOKOMOTIV Tbilisi            1-0  ODO Tbilisi

Semifinals
 [Jun 16] 
 DINAMO Rostov-na-Donu        4-0  Spartak Yerevan 
 DINAMO Yerevan               2-0  Lokomotiv Tbilisi

Final
 [Jun 24] 
 DINAMO Yerevan               6-1  Dinamo Rostov-na-Donu

Group Center

First round
 [Jun 13] 
 Burevestnik Moskva           1-1  Sudostroitel Leningrad 
 Dinamo Riga                  0-1  METRO Moskva 
 Dinamo Vilnius               2-3  PISHCHEVIK Moskva 
 DO Leningrad                 1-0  Trudoviye Rezervy Moskva 
 KALEV Tallinn                3-0  DO Minsk 
 Spartak Leningrad            1-2  LOKOMOTIV Moskva 
 VMS Moskva                   4-2  MVO Moskva

First round replays
 [Jun 14] 
 BUREVESTNIK Moskva           3-2  Sudostroitel Leningrad

Quarterfinals
 [Jun 17] 
 DO Leningrad                 3-1  Lokomotiv Moskva 
 DZERZHINETS Leningrad        2-1  Pishchevik Moskva 
 VMS Moskva                   2-0  Kalev Tallinn 
 [Jun 18] 
 BUREVESTNIK Moskva           1-0  Metro Moskva

Semifinals
 [Jun 22] 
 DZERZHINETS Leningrad        1-0  DO Leningrad 
 VMS Moskva                   6-3  Burevestnik Moskva

Final
 [Jun 29] 
 Dzerzhinets Leningrad        0-5  VMS Moskva

Group Ukraine

First round
 [Jun 1] 
 DINAMO Kishinev              4-1  Dzerzhinets Kharkov 
 ODO Kiev                     1-2  SHAKHTYOR Stalino 
 Stal Dnepropetrovsk          1-1  Pishchevik Odessa 
 [Jun 5] 
 SPARTAK Uzhgorod             3-1  Sudostroitel Nikolayev

First round replays
 [Jun 2] 
 STAL Dnepropetrovsk          3-2  Pishchevik Odessa            [aet]

Quarterfinals
 [Jun 15] 
 DINAMO Voroshilovgrad        2-0  Lokomotiv Kharkov 
 SHAKHTYOR Stalino            5-0  Bolshevik Zaporozhye 
 SPARTAK Kherson              3-1  Dinamo Kishinev 
 STAL Dnepropetrovsk          6-2  Spartak Uzhgorod

Semifinals
 [Jun 21] 
 Spartak Kherson              0-1  DINAMO Voroshilovgrad 
 [Jun 22] 
 Stal Dnepropetrovsk          2-2  Shakhtyor Stalino

Semifinals replays
 [Jun 23] 
 Stal Dnepropetrovsk          3-3  Shakhtyor Stalino 
 [Jun 25] 
 STAL Dnepropetrovsk          w/o  Shakhtyor Stalino 
   [Match abandoned at 2–0, when Shakhtyor had 7 players left on the pitch]

Final
 [Jun 29] 
 DINAMO Voroshilovgrad        3-1  Stal Dneropetrovsk

Group Central Asia

First round
 [Jun 1] 
 DINAMO Stalinabad            w/o  Spartak Alma-Ata

Quarterfinals
 [Jun 1] 
 Dinamo Frunze                1-2  ODO Tashkent                 [aet]
 DINAMO Tashkent              2-1  Spartak Tashkent             [aet] 
 Lokomotiv Ashkhabad          0-3  DINAMO Alma-Ata 
 [Jun 8] 
 Zenit Frunze                 1-4  DINAMO Stalinabad

Semifinals
 [Jun 15] 
 DINAMO Alma-Ata              1-0  ODO Tashkent 
 Dinamo Tashkent              0-2  DINAMO Stalinabad

Final
 [Jun 22] 
 DINAMO Alma-Ata              2-1  Dinamo Stalinabad

Final stage
All games were played in Moscow.

First round
 [Jul 1] 
 SPARTAK Moskva               4-0  Torpedo Gorkiy 
   [Nikolai Dementyev 15, Ivan Konov 18, 32, Georgiy Glazkov 55] 
 [Jul 2] 
 CDKA Moskva                  5-0  Dinamo Yerevan 
   [Vsevolod Bobrov 1, Grigoriy Fedotov 16, Alexei Grinin 41, Alexei Vodyagin 55, Vladimir Dyomin 72] 
 KRYLYA SOVETOV Kuibyshev     3-1  Dinamo Alma-Ata          [aet] 
   [Vasiliy Provornov 25, 98, 120 – Ogoltsov 26]

Second round
 [Jul 3] 
 Dinamo Voroshilovgrad   3-3  Dinamo Chelyabinsk            [aet]
   [Gavrilenko 34, 78, Karpeichik 112 – Zhenishek 18, 64, Bugrov 96]
 [Jul 4] 
 DINAMO Tbilisi          1-0  Dinamo Minsk 
   [Spartak Jejelava 19] 
 [Jul 5] 
 DINAMO Kiev             2-1  Traktor Stalingrad 
   [Pavel Vinkovatov 11, 16 – Viktor Shvedchenko 27 pen] 
 TORPEDO Moskva          6-0  VMS Moskva 
   [Vasiliy Zharkov 39, Georgiy Zharkov 43, Alexandr Ponomaryov 56, 71, 80, Yuriy Shebilov 86] 
 [Jul 6] 
 CDKA Moskva             4-1  Dinamo Moskva 
   [Vsevolod Bobrov 25, 43, Vladimir Dyomin 28, 57 – Sergei Solovyov 20] 
 VVS Moskva              0-1  ZENIT Leningrad 
   [Friedrich Maryutin 30] 
 [Jul 7] 
 Krylya Sovetov Moskva   0-2  DINAMO Leningrad 
   [Vasiliy Lotkov 15, Vladimir Kornev 60] 
 SPARTAK Moskva          3-0  Krylya Sovetov Kuibyshev 
   [Alexei Sokolov 12, Sergei Salnikov 76, Nikolai Dementyev 85]

Second round replays
 [Jul 4] 
 DINAMO Voroshilovgrad   5-2  Dinamo Chelyabinsk            
   [Smirnov 25, Gavrilenko 38, 66, 79, Makarashvili 52 – Zhenishek 60, 76]

Quarterfinals
 [Jul 8] 
 TORPEDO Moskva          2-1  Dinamo Tbilisi        [aet] 
   [Vasiliy Panfilov 65, Vasiliy Zharkov 114 – Gayoz Jejelava 10] 
 [Jul 9] 
 CDKA Moskva             4-0  Dinamo Voroshilovgrad 
   [Vyacheslav Solovyov 6, Vsevolod Bobrov 20, Alexei Grinin 25, Vladimir Dyomin 68]
 [Jul 10] 
 SPARTAK Moskva          2-0  Dinamo Kiev 
   [Sergei Salnikov 25, 55] 
 [Jul 11] 
 DINAMO Leningrad        1-0  Zenit Leningrad       [Played in Moskva]
   [Alexandr A.Fyodorov 83]

Semifinals
 [Jul 13] 
 TORPEDO Moskva          1-0  CDKA Moskva 
   [Vasiliy Zharkov 30] 
 [Jul 14] 
 SPARTAK Moskva          2-1  Dinamo Leningrad 
   [Sergei Salnikov 10, Alexei Sokolov 68 – Vasiliy Lotkov 16]

Final

External links
 Complete calendar. helmsoccer.narod.ru
 1947 Soviet Cup. Footballfacts.ru
 1947 Soviet football season. RSSSF

Soviet Cup seasons
Cup
Soviet Cup
Soviet Cup